Lithuania participated in the Eurovision Song Contest 2001 with the song "You Got Style" written by Viktoras Diawara, Vilius Alesius and Erica Jennings. The song was performed by the group Skamp. The Lithuanian broadcaster Lithuanian National Radio and Television (LRT) returned to the Eurovision Song Contest after a one-year absence following their relegation in 2000 as one of the six countries with the lowest average scores over the previous five contests. LRT organised the national final "Eurovizijos" dainų konkurso nacionalinė atranka (Eurovision Song Contest national selection) in order to select the Lithuanian entry for the 2001 contest in Copenhagen, Denmark. The national final involved 15 competing entries and "You Got Style" performed by Skamp was selected as the winner following the combination of votes from a jury panel, votes from the venue audience and a public vote.

Lithuania competed in the Eurovision Song Contest which took place on 12 May 2001. Performing during the show in position eight, Lithuania placed thirteenth out of the 24 participating countries, scoring 35 points.

Background 

Prior to the 2001 contest, Lithuania had participated in the Eurovision Song Contest twice since its first entry in 1994. The nation’s best placing in the contest was twentieth, which it achieved in 1999 with the song "Strazdas" performed by Aistė. For the 2001 contest, the Lithuanian national broadcaster, Lithuanian National Radio and Television (LRT), broadcast the event within Lithuania and organised the selection process for the nation's entry. Lithuania has selected their debut entry in 1994 through an internal selection, while a national final procedure selected the Lithuanian entry in 1999. For 2001, LRT organized "Eurovizijos" dainų konkurso nacionalinė atranka as the national final to select Lithuania's entry for Copenhagen.

Before Eurovision

"Eurovizijos" dainų konkurso nacionalinė atranka 
"Eurovizijos" dainų konkurso nacionalinė atranka (Eurovision Song Contest national selection) was the national final format developed by LRT in order to select Lithuania's entry for the Eurovision Song Contest 2001. The competition took place on 9 March 2001 at the Palace of Sports and Culture in Vilnius, hosted by Neringa Svetikaitė and Darius Užkuraitis and was broadcast on LTV and LTV2.

Competing entries 
LRT opened a submission period for artists and songwriters to submit their entries with the deadline on 12 November 2000. On 8 January 2001, LRT announced the 15 entries selected for the competition from 36 submissions received. The eight-member jury panel that selected the competing entries consisted of Gytis Daugėla (President of the Music Culture Support Fund), Faustas Latėnas (composer), Janina Miščiukaitė (singer), Justas Mamontovas (recording company "Partija" director), Simona Jansonaitė (Respublika journalist), Vytautas Juozapaitis (opera singer), Daiva Rinkevičiūtė (Lietuvos rytas journalist) and Zita Kelmickaitė (Head of LRT's music editorial board).

Final 
The competition took place on 9 March 2001 and featured the 15 competing entries. "You Got Style" performed by Skamp was selected as the winner following the combination of votes from a jury panel (50%), the audience in the venue (25%) and public televoting (25%). The members of the jury consisted of Vaclovas Augustinas (composer and conductor), Zita Kelmickaitė (Head of LRT's music editorial board), Vytautas Kernagis (singer-songwriter), Viktoras Malinauskas (singer), Ramunė Piekautaitė (fashion designer), Daiva Rinkevičiūtė (TV Antena journalist), Gintaras Sodeika (Chairman of the Lithuanian Composers' Union), Daiva Tamošiūnaitė (Radiocentras presenter), Gintaras Varnas (director) and Edita Vilčiauskienė (Lietuvos Radijas music editor). In addition to the performances of the competing entries, Arnis Mednis opened the show with the 2001 Latvian Eurovision entry "Too Much".

At Eurovision

The Eurovision Song Contest 2001 took place at Parken Stadium in Copenhagen, Denmark, on 12 May 2001. The relegation rules introduced for the 1997 contest were again utilised ahead of the 2001 contest, based on each country's average points total in previous contests. The 23 participants were made up of the host country, the "Big Four" (France, Germany, Spain and the United Kingdom), and the 12 countries with the highest average scores between the 1996 and 2000 contests competed in the final. On 21 November 2000, an allocation draw was held which determined the running order and Lithuania was set to perform in position eight, following the entry from Sweden and before the entry from Latvia. Lithuania finished in 13th place with 35 points. The show was broadcast in Lithuania on LTV with commentary by Darius Užkuraitis.

Voting 

Voting during the show involved each country awarding points from 1-8, 10 and 12 as determined by either 100% televoting or a combination of 50% televoting and 50% national jury. In cases where televoting was not possible, only the votes of the eight-member national juries were tabulated. Lithuania received 35 points, with its highest award of 10 points coming from Russia. The nation awarded its top 12 points to contest winners Estonia. Loreta Tarozaitė was the Lithuanian spokesperson announcing the country's voting results during the show. Below is a breakdown of points awarded to Lithuania and awarded by Lithuania in the contest.

References

2001
Countries in the Eurovision Song Contest 2001
Eurovision